Afghanistan–Pakistan Confederation plan referred to a plan proposed between the governments of Afghanistan and Pakistan between 1953 and 1954 to merge both countries under a single confederation.

These plans were started by Ayub Khan, the president of Pakistan and the Royal family of Afghanistan under King Zahir Shah who requested assistance from United States citing fears that if Pakistan ceased to exist so would Afghanistan from threats with Soviet Union and India.

History 

Afghanistan and Pakistan had a heated relationship since its inception due to the Pashtunistan issue by which Afghanistan laid claims to Pakistan's northwestern region. In September 1947 Afghanistan voted against Pakistan's entry into the United Nations due to the fact that NWFP went to Pakistan, however, in October 1947 it withdrew its negative vote under the condition of merging as Afghanistan didn't like the idea of a Hindu Majority India bordering it since it would mean that Afghanistan would have continuously been in conflict with India.

Further reading 

 Dupree, Louis. "A Suggested Pakistan-Afghanistan-Iran Federation." Middle East Journal, vol. 17, no. 4, 1963, pp. 383–99. JSTOR, Accessed 20 February 2023.

See also 

 Afghanistan-Pakistan relations
 Pashtunistan
 Durand Line

References 

Modern history of Afghanistan
Modern history of Pakistan
Barakzai dynasty